Ocean Speedway, formerly known as Watsonville Speedway, is a dirt oval located in Watsonville, California, United States, at the Santa Cruz County Fairgrounds.

History
The track was the brainchild of retired driver Bert Moreland and a small group of others in late 1959.  They came up with a plan to put a 1/4 mile race track in the infield of the existing 1/2 mile horse track.  The first race took place May 27, 1960 and was won by Art Eaton.  Figure 8 racing was introduced to the area at the speedway in 1964 and was popular with fans and drivers.  Ray Elder was one of the most notable drivers to compete at Watsonville Speedway in its early days.  The track then turned to stock cars in the 1970s.  Future NASCAR driver and Daytona 500 winner Ernie Irvan was turned away by the track for having illegal parts on his car, so he turned his attention to pavement-racing elsewhere.  In the 1980s, the NASCAR late model stock cars were the feature division and were a part of the Winston Racing Series, where drivers could compete for national and regional points.  Another NASCAR legend, Bobby Allison, raced at the track once, in 1983, in a late model. The Grand American Modifieds made their debut in 1990.  Ken Schrader, Kenny Wallace, Geoff Bodine, Ernie Irvan and his father, Vic, ran a "Race of Champions" against each other in the modifieds in 1999 while they were in the area for the NASCAR race in Sonoma. A year later, Mike Skinner, Sterling Marlin, Jimmy Spencer, Vic Irvan, and track sponsor John Prentice competed in the second edition of the event.  Super modifieds made sporadic appearances at the speedway in the 1960s and 1970s.  Sprint cars also made appearances at the track on a staggered basis with local series, including the Northern Auto Racing Club (NARC) and the Golden State Challenge/King of California Series. The annual Trophy Cup was held once at the speedway in 2000.

Ocean Speedway era
Former street stock and dwarf car driver Prentice took over operation of the track in 2006 and renamed it "Ocean Speedway", in alliance with the Ocean Chevrolet and Honda dealerships located in Santa Cruz County, where he worked as the general manager.  Several years after Prentice acquired the track, a lawsuit was filed against the speedway and the fairgrounds by a neighborhood group called the Community Alliance for Fairgrounds Accountability, or CAFA, alleging the track was a nuisance due to the noise the cars produced.  After being stayed three times while both parties looked for common ground, the lawsuit was dropped and races were allowed to continue with stricter sound rules and an earlier curfew. The track currently hosts a weekly 360 sprint car championship along with other divisions including IMCA modifieds and sportmods, midgets, dwarf cars, hobby stocks, and four-cylinders.  The track also holds six "police-N-pursuit" races a year, in which police officers, detectives, and other officials representing local agencies compete to raise money for Special Olympics of Northern California.  In 2017, the group raised $34,000 for the charity.  Travelling series that visit the track include the World of Outlaws, NARC/King of the West 410 sprint cars, Sprint Car Challenge Tour, and the IMCA All Star Modified Tour.  The start of the 2020 season was delayed until June 19th due to the COVID-19 pandemic.  The 2020 season was affected once more because of the CZU Lightning Complex fires burning nearby, cancelling races in August.

Notable drivers
Some notable drivers who have made appearances at Ocean Speedway over the years include World of Outlaws champions Steve Kinser, Sammy Swindell, Mark Kinser, Danny Lasoski, Donny Schatz, Daryn Pittman, and Brad Sweet. Indianapolis 500 competitor, Bryan Clauson made his winged sprint car debut at the track in 2011.  Current NASCAR driver Kyle Larson, former NASCAR drivers Kasey Kahne, Rico Abreu, Kraig Kinser, Tayler Malsam, and Tyler Walker have also raced at the track, along with Cheryl Linn Glass, Doug McCoun, Ron Shuman, Lance Norick, Gio Scelzi, Jesse Love, Logan Seavey, Tanner Thorson, Shane Golobic, James Bondurant, David Gravel, Jac Haudenschild, Kerry Madsen, Joey Saldana, Lucas Wolfe, Dale Blaney, Johnny Herrera, Cory Kruseman, Brady Bacon, Michael Pickens, and Olympic athlete Josh Lakatos.  Cole Custer won at the track in a USAC Jr. Ford Focus midget in 2011.  Super Bowl XXIII champion linebacker, Sam Kennedy, races at the track in the hobby stocks on a now-and-then basis.

List of track champions
Track championships have been awarded since the track opened in 1960 in the Claimer Division.  The division was discontinued in 1964 in favor of the sportsman class. The micro 600s was a short-lived division at the track, awarding championships from 2008 to 2012.  Champions in the division were: Devon Ostheimer in 2008, Orval Burke Jr. in 2009–10, Tomas Bray in 2011, and Alexander Mead in 2012.

See also
List of dirt track ovals in the United States
West Coast Stock Car Hall of Fame
Dirt track racing

References

Further reading
RACE REPORT: Steve Kinser Wins at Ocean Speedway
KRUSEMAN WINS OCEAN SPEEDWAY CRA/CLASSIC 30-LAPPER
Ocean Speedway's Prentice invited to speak at race promoters workshop
10th Season for Ocean Sprints in 2016
Berryhill Racing brings gold home to American Canyon
Watsonville Speedway results

External links 
Official Website

Dirt oval race tracks in the United States
Motorsport venues in California
Watsonville, California